Anexate is the trade name of two different drugs:

 Flumazenil, a benzodiazepine antagonist
 Mefenorex, a stimulant drug which was used as an appetite suppressant